Turon may refer to:

Turon, Kansas, a town in the United States
Turón, a town in Granada, Spain
Turón (Mieres), a parish in Mieres, Spain
Turon (food), a Filipino dessert made of banana and jackfruit, wrapped in an eggroll wrapper, and then fried
The Turon River in Australia
Turon National Park in Australia
Turoń, a  festive monstrosity from Polish folklore
FC Turon, an association football club based in Yaypan, Uzbekistan
Former European name of Da Nang, a port city in Vietnam

See also
Touron, a derogatory combination of "tourist" and "moron"
Turrón, a southern European nougat confection